Nick Ross (born February 10, 1989) is a Canadian professional ice hockey defenceman who is currently playing for Ducs d'Angers of the Ligue Magnus. 

He was drafted by the Phoenix Coyotes with the 30th pick of the 2007 NHL Entry Draft.

Playing career
Ross began his major junior career in the WHL with the Regina Pats in 2004–05, appearing in 10 games. After a 31-point campaign with the Pats in 2006–07, Ross was drafted 30th overall in the 2007 NHL Entry Draft by the Phoenix Coyotes. The next season, back in the WHL, he was traded from the Pats to the Kamloops Blazers on January 5, 2008, along with Spencer Fraipont and a fourth-round bantam draft pick, in exchange for Victor Bartley and Ryan Bender. Upon being eliminated from the 2008 WHL playoffs with the Blazers, the Coyotes assigned Ross to the San Antonio Rampage of the American Hockey League (AHL) for the remaining 4 games of the 2007–08 AHL season.

Returning to the Blazers the following season, in 2008–09, Ross was traded, along with Alex Rodgers, just before the January 10, 2009 trade deadline, to the Vancouver Giants in exchange for Curtis Kulchar and three bantam draft picks. He finished the season with an accumulated 43 points between the two teams. In the subsequent 2009 playoffs, after sweeping the Prince George Cougars, the Giants were pushed to a seventh game against the Spokane Chiefs in the second round where Ross scored the series-clinching goal in overtime – a point shot that deflected off a Chiefs defenceman.

On July 30, 2013, Ross returned for a second stint in the Austrian Hockey League, signing a one-year contract with HDD Olimpija Ljubljana. In the 2013–14 season, Ross enjoyed a more productive second tenure in the EBEL, posting 28 points in 39 games before opting to finish the season in the Italian Elite.A with HC Asiago.

On April 16, 2014, Ross signed to continue in the EBEL, joining his third club in as many seasons in agreeing to a one-year deal with HC TWK Innsbruck.

Family
His younger brother, Brad Ross (born 1992), was selected by the Toronto Maple Leafs in the 2nd round (43rd overall) of the 2010 NHL Entry Draft, and is currently playing with the Iserlohn Roosters of the Deutsche Eishockey Liga (DEL).

Career statistics

Regular season and playoffs

International

References

External links

1989 births
Living people
Arizona Coyotes draft picks
Asiago Hockey 1935 players
Augsburger Panther players
Canadian expatriate ice hockey players in Austria
Canadian expatriate ice hockey players in Germany
Canadian expatriate ice hockey players in Italy
Canadian expatriate ice hockey players in Slovenia
Canadian expatriate ice hockey players in the United States
Canadian ice hockey defencemen
EC Red Bull Salzburg players
HC TWK Innsbruck players
HKM Zvolen players
HDD Olimpija Ljubljana players
Kamloops Blazers players
Las Vegas Wranglers players
National Hockey League first-round draft picks
Portland Pirates players
Regina Pats players
San Antonio Rampage players
Ice hockey people from Edmonton
Vancouver Giants players
DVTK Jegesmedvék players
HK Dukla Michalovce players
Lausitzer Füchse players
Dornbirn Bulldogs players
Ducs d'Angers players
Canadian expatriate ice hockey players in Slovakia
Canadian expatriate ice hockey players in France
Canadian expatriate ice hockey players in Hungary